Texas (1985) is a novel by American writer James A. Michener (1907-1997), based on the history of the Lone Star State. Characters include real and fictional characters spanning hundreds of years, such as explorers, Spanish colonists, American immigrants, German Texan settlers, ranchers, oil men, aristocrats, Chicanos, and others, all based on extensive historical research.

Background
Michener did extensive research on the novel in Texas, receiving much support from the state government. Governor Bill Clements offered him access to numerous state archives and research staff at the University of Texas at Austin. Michener rented 3506 Mt. Bonnell Road for $1 per year to write the manuscript.

At 1,076 pages, it was the longest Michener novel published by Random House. Given the success of his previous novels, the company did a first printing of 750,000 copies, 'the largest in the company's history.'

Chapters
The book is divided into an introduction and 14 subsequent chapters:

The Governor's Task Force - provides a fictional account of the setting up of a group in 1983 to write a report encouraging an interest in Texas history on the eve of the sesquicentenary in 1986. Each chapter traces the events and lives of key characters then ends with a return to the present time alongside some analysis of the themes covered.

 Land of Many Lands - Introduces the early Mexican expeditions of Cabeza de Vaca, Fray Marcos, and Coronado in the 1530s and 1540s. Other elements include Esteban, Isla de Malhado, the Seven Cities of Cibola, Quivira, El Turco, the Requerimiento, and The Black Legend.
 The Mission - Covers the era in the 18th century of evangelism by Franciscans, the construction of missions and presidio (i.e. Presidio San Antonio de Béxar), and settlement by Spanish (i.e. Canary Islanders led by Juan Leal Goras), criollo, and mestizo immigrants in central and north-eastern New Spain. Other elements include matchmaking paseo, land acquisition, conflicts in Apacheria and Comancheria, relations with French Louisiana, and Catholic martydom. 
 El Camino Real - Explains the weakening of the missions in the late 18th century and how "The Royal Road" running through San Antonio linked the barren north with the more prosperous south of Spanish Texas. The early focus on casta, particularly by the Spanish-born class, influenced marriage and land ownership, contrasting with the culture of the non-Spanish entering the area from the north.
 The Settlers - Details the ongoing influx of settlers from the north in the 1820s. Crossing the Neutral Ground, immigrants were often attracted by empresario (such as Stephen F. Austin) but had to submit to Catholocism in order to settle. Many brought with them strong convictions about  freedom, government, and religion. Conflict over land with natives (such as the Karankawa) also ensued, leading to their eventual displacement. 
 The Trace - By the early 1830s, the Mississippi and the Natchez Trace (where Meriweather Lewis died) became organised routes for migration and trade to Texas, slowly becoming more settled and less lawless. The influence of Scots-Irish Protestants is highlighted particularly in land settlement (i.e. league and a labor grants) and early industry (selling horses and cattle to New Orleans) alongside the local Mexicans. 
 Three Men, Three Battles - Traces the events leading up to the Texas Revolution of 1835-1836, a rebellion of Texians and Tejanos resisting the centralist government of Mexico. The campaign north by Santa Anna and his forces result in the clashes at the Alamo Mission in Béxar, and near the Presidio La Bahía in Goliad. Despite the general chaos, rivalry, and indecision shown by the various commanders, including Sam Houston's Runaway Scrape, a decisive final battle at San Jacinto secures independence.
 The Texians - Covers the formative and chaotic period of the Republic of Texas (1836-1845) and the ongoing skirmishes across the Nueces Strip. Governing the new nation was difficult given its size and formative legal institutions. The presidencies of Sam Houston and Mirabeau B. Lamar are detailed against increasing tensions with native tribes (see Texas Cherokees, Council House Fight, and Great Raid of 1840) and Mexicans. The arrival of German Texan settlers help the developing industry and agriculture sectors. 
 The Ranger - After being granted statehood, the Mexican-American War (1846-1848) erupts. 
 Loyalties
 The Fort
 The Frontier
 The Town
 The Invaders
 Power and Change

Reception
Texas Monthly magazine did not like the novel, awarding Michener its 'Bum Steer of the Year Award' (given to people who have done something to merit ridicule or embarrassment) for the work's "hackneyed dialogue" and "tendency to resort to stereotypes". The journal, however, made peace with Michener later.

Adaptations
The novel was adapted as a 1994 made-for-TV movie of the same name, directed by Richard Lang and featuring actors Stacy Keach, Benjamin Bratt, Rick Schroder and Patrick Duffy.

References

External links

1985 American novels
Novels by James A. Michener
American historical novels
Texas literature
Random House books
Novels set in Texas
American novels adapted into films